My Sister and I is an apocryphal work attributed to the German philosopher Friedrich Nietzsche.  Following the Nietzsche scholar Walter Kaufmann, most consider the work to be a literary forgery, although a small minority argues for the book's authenticity.

It was supposedly written in 1889 or early 1890 during Nietzsche's stay in a mental asylum in the Thuringian city of Jena. If legitimate, My Sister and I would be Nietzsche's second autobiographical and final overall work, chronologically following his Wahnbriefe (Madness Letters), written during his extended time of mental collapse. My Sister and I makes several bold and otherwise unreported biographical claims, most notably of an incestuous relationship between Nietzsche and his sister Elisabeth Förster-Nietzsche, as well as an affair with Richard Wagner's wife Cosima. It is written in a style that combines anecdote and aphorism in a manner similar to other Nietzsche works.

History
My Sister and I was first published in 1951 by Boar's Head Books and distributed by Seven Sirens Press in New York City. Along with Nietzsche's authorship attribution, the translation from German was credited to noted early Nietzsche scholar Oscar Levy.

The book was tied quickly to controversial publisher Samuel Roth, the putative owner of Seven Sirens, who had spent jail time for the unlawful distribution of a version of James Joyce's Ulysses (1922).  In the book's introduction, an anonymous publisher claimed to have received the manuscript from a fellow inmate of Nietzsche's in Jena and to have hired Levy to translate the work only to have both German and English manuscripts confiscated, with only the latter surviving.

In a response letter, Levy's daughter vehemently denied her father's involvement with My Sister and I. Kaufmann claimed in a footnote in his Nietzsche: Philosopher, Psychologist, Antichrist (first published 1950) to have received a ghostwriting confession from minor author David George Plotkin in 1965.

Reception
Nietzsche scholars in general adopted the opinion of Kaufmann, who immediately identified the book as a forgery in a 1952 article. Evidence against the book cited both by Kaufmann and later commentators includes anachronisms, such as a reference to an 1898 incident, incongruous references to Marxism, and the city of Detroit (globally unknown in the late 19th century), along with a seemingly poor grasp of philosophy and sexualized pulpy content. Kaufmann also notes instances of clever wordplay in this English text that are impossible to express as such in the German language.

Since the only copy of this alleged work is in English, and there is not a single page of what would have been his original in German, opinion has been largely that the work is a forgery.

Nevertheless, a minority holds the work to be authentic.  Beginning in the mid-1980s, a handful of articles began to call for its reevaluation, including references to more recently discovered journals and letters from Nietzsche and Cosima Wagner. Amok Books' 1990 edition reprints many secondary articles on the subject, and includes an original introduction calling for a reevaluation of the book.  Nietzsche scholar Walter K. Stewart, in his 185 page monograph Nietzsche: My Sister and I — A Critical Study published in 2007, argues for the original's potential legitimacy by conducting a point-by-point analysis of Kaufmann's book review.  In his 2011 followup, Friedrich Nietzsche My Sister and I: Investigation, Analysis, Interpretation, Stewart uses direct textual analysis to argue that whoever wrote My Sister and I was intimate with every aspect of Nietzsche’s life and perspective.

Editions
 My Sister and I by Friedrich Nietzsche. Trans. and intr. by Oscar Levy. New York: Boar's Head Books 1951; several reprints, mostly diffused: My Sister and I. Trans. and intr. by Oscar Levy. Los Angeles: Amok Books 1990  (includes reprints of the controversies on the book)

Translations
(Author's name always Friedrich Nietzsche)
 German: Ich und meine Schwester. Das Werk aus der Nervenklinik. Wien: Turia + Kant 1993  (angekündigt, nicht erschienen)
 Hebrew: [Achoti Ve-Ani]. Trans. by Halit Yeshurun. Tel Aviv: Yedioth Ahronoth Books 2006 (with a review Nietzsche contra Nietzsche by Yeshayahu Yariv)
 Japanese: Hi ni kakenoboru / [Übers.:] Rin Jûbishi. - Tôkyô : Shiki-sha 1956
 Korean: Nich'e-ch'oehu-ŭi-kobaek: na-ŭi-nui-wa-na = My sister & I / P'ŭridŭrihi Nich'e. Yi Tŏk-hŭi omgim. Yi, Tŏk-hŭi [Übers.]. Sŏul: Chakka Chŏngsin 1999 
 Portuguese: A minha irmã e eu. Trad. de Pedro José Leal. Lisboa: Hiena 1990
 Brazilian Portuguese: Minha irmã e eu. Trad. de Rubens Eduardo Frías. São Paulo: Moraes 1992 
 Spanish: Mi hermana y yo. Trad. de Bella M. Abelia. Buenos Aires: Rueda 1956; Barcelona: Hacer 1980; Madrid: EDAF 1996 
 Chinese: 《我妹妹和我》. Trans. by 陈苍多. 文化艺术出版社 2009 

References

Sources
 Walter Kaufmann: Nietzsche and the Seven Sirens. In: Partisan Review, vol. 19, no. 3 (May/June 1952), pp. 372–376 (incl. in Amok-Edition)
 Walter Kaufmann: Review: My Sister and I. In: Philosophical Review, vol. 65, no. 1 (Jan 1955), pp. 152–153 (incl. in Amok-Edition)
 Heinz Frederick Peters: Zarathustra's Sister. The case of Elisabeth and Friedrich Nietzsche. New York: Crown Publishers 1977
 Walter K. Stewart: My Sister an I. The Disputed Nietzsche. In: Thought. A review of Culture and Idea, vol. 61, no. 242 (1986), pp. 321–335 (incl. in Amok-Edition)
 Pia Daniela Volz: Der unbekannte Erotiker. Nietzsches fiktive Autobiographie ‚My Sister and I‘. In: Karl Corino (Hg.): Gefälscht! Nördlingen: Greno 1988, S. 287−304
 Hermann Josef Schmidt: Nietzsche absconditus oder Spurenlesen bei Nietzsche. Kindheit. Teil 3. Berlin / Aschaffenburg: IBDK-Verlag 1990, S. 629–663 
 R[eginald] J[ohn] Hollingdale: Review of 'My Sister and I'. (ed. Amok Books). In: Journal of Nietzsche Studies, issue 2, autumn 1991, pp. 95–102
 K[athleen] J. Wininger: The Disputed Nietzsche. In: Telos. A Quarterly Journal of Critical Thought, number 91, spring 1992, pp. 185–189 (Review of My Sister and I)
 Heward Wilkinson: review of My Sister and I. In: International Journal of Psychotherapy, vol. 2, n. 1, 1997, pp. 119–124
 Heward Wilkinson: Retrieving a posthumous text-message; Nietzsche's fall: the significance of the disputed asylum writing, My Sister and I. In: International Journal of Psychotherapy, vol. 7, n. 1, 2002, pp. 53–68
 Yeshayahu Yariv: "Nietzsche contra Nietzsche". Tel Aviv 2006 (Afterword to the Hebrew edition)
 Walter K. Stewart: Nietzsche: My Sister and I. A Critical Study s.l.: Xlibris 2007  (first monography on topic, 185 pp.)
 Walter K. Stewart: Friedrich Nietzsche: My Sister and I. Investigation, Analysis, Interpretation''.  Xlibris 2011  (290 pp.)

Books about Friedrich Nietzsche
Literary forgeries
1951 books